The Prims is a 91 km long river in western Germany, right tributary of the Saar. It rises in the Hunsrück mountains, near the village Malborn. It flows generally south through the towns Nonnweiler, Wadern and Schmelz. It flows into the Saar in Dillingen.

See also
List of rivers of Saarland
List of rivers of Rhineland-Palatinate

External link

Rivers of Saarland
Rivers of Rhineland-Palatinate
Rivers of the Hunsrück
Rivers of Germany